Baby Huey's Great Easter Adventure is a 1999 live-action direct-to-video film directed by Stephen Furst, based on the Harvey Entertainment Company animated character Baby Huey. It was released by Columbia TriStar Home Video on VHS on March 2, 1999, and on DVD on February 15, 2005, by Classic Media.

A majority of the film's cast and crew were National Lampoon veterans.

Cast

 Rodger Bumpass as Baby Huey (costume), Irv
 Stephen Furst as the voice of Baby Huey, Phantoms' Manager
 Harvey Korman as Prof. von Klupp
 Joseph Bologna as P.T. Wynnsocki
 David Lander as Bernie
 Maureen McCormick as Nick's Mom
 David Leisure as Nick's Dad
 Michael Angarano as Nick
 John Vernon as Principal Scotti
 Denny Dillon as Crabby Mom
 Promise LaMarco as Teacher
 Allyce Beasley as Elsa
 Laraine Newman as Minnie
 Rachel Snow as Lotta
 Tiffany Taunman as Little Audrey
 Melissa Haizlip as Miss Twinkle
 Kate Simmons as Patsy
 Peter Jurasik as Tigers' Manager
 Leonard Joseph as Gym Teacher
 Stuart Pankin as Umpire

Production
The film was part of a 12 film slate of direct to video productions by Harvey Entertainment based on their properties. Harvey Entertainment reported an estimated loss of $250,000 directly tied to the film.

References

External links
 

1999 films
American children's films
Live-action films based on animated series
Films about ducks
Films based on Harvey Comics
Puppet films
Sony Pictures direct-to-video films
Films about Easter
1990s English-language films
Films directed by Stephen Furst
1990s American films